Zande is a town in Koekelare, West Flanders, Belgium.

External links
Zande @ City Review

Populated places in West Flanders
Koekelare